Ralph de Neville may refer to:
 Ralph Neville (died 1244), Lord Chancellor of England and Bishop of Chichester. 
 Ralph Neville, 1st Earl of Westmorland (c. 1364 – 21 October 1425), an English nobleman.

See also
 Ralph Neville (disambiguation)